Kirkville may refer to:

Kirkville, Iowa
Kirkville, Itawamba County, Mississippi
Kirkville, Pike County, Mississippi
Kirkville, New York